Savonlinnan Pallokerho (SaPKo) was an ice hockey team from Savonlinna, Finland, they formerly play in the Mestis league. It plays its home matches at the Talvisalo ice rink.

The sports club Savonlinnan Pallokerho was founded in 1929. First it consisted football and bandy sections, but since the 1960s ice hockey has been the main sport.

In 1960s SaPKo played four seasons in the highest tier of Finnish ice hockey SM-sarja but was relegated to Suomi-sarja in 1971. In 1974 the new First Division was formed and SaPKo was one of the teams participating. SaPKo soon established itself as the team of I-divisioona expect few visits to Second Division. In 1968 SaPKo worked its way to the final of Finnish Cup, but lost the final to KooVee 10–2.

Later bigger success came in the season 1994/1995 when SaPKo had very good regular season with players like Team Canada captain Brian Tutt and was close to promotion to the SM-liiga. It played tight promotion playoffs against Ilves but failed to promote. After the success started downtrend which culminated to relegation to Suomi-sarja. At the end of the 2005/2006 season SaPKo finally gained promotion back to the second tier, Mestis. On 22 June 2022 SaPKo filed for bankruptcy, due to Financial difficulties.

Honours

Mestis
 (1): 2017
 (1): 2018

Suomi-sarja
 (1): 2003
 (1): 2006

Finnish cup
 (3): 1967, 1968, 2017

Notable players

 Arto Heiskanen
 Jarkko Immonen
 
 Niko Laakkonen
 Jukka-Pekka Laamanen
 Ville Leino
 Steve MacDonald
 Randy Maxwell
 Jarmo Myllys
 Tuukka Rask
 Seppo Repo
 Reino Soijärvi
 Antti Tirkkonen
 Pekka Tirkkonen
 Paavo Tirkkonen
 Tommi Turunen
 Seppo Aksila
 Brian Tutt
 Viktor Tyumenev
 Jan-Mikael Järvinen

Retired numbers
 2 Paavo Tirkkonen
 3 Jyrki Turunen
 5 Ahti Ruohoaho
 10 Raimo Turkulainen

External links
 Official website

Mestis teams
Savonlinna
Association football clubs established in 1929
Bandy clubs established in 1929
Ice hockey clubs established in 1929